St Bridget's Church or Church of St Bridget may refer to:

United Kingdom 
 St Bridget's Church, Brigham, Cumbria, England
 St Bridget's Church, Calder Bridge, Cumbria, England
 Church of St Bridget, Chelvey, Brockey, Somerset, England
 Church of Saint Bridget, Liverpool, England
 St Bridget's Church, West Kirby, Wirral, Chester, England
 St Bridget's Kirk, Dalgety Bay, Fife, Scotland
 St. Bridget's Church, Skenfrith, Wales

United States 
 Church of St. Bridget-Catholic, De Graff, Minnesota, United States

See also
 Saint Brigid's Church (disambiguation)